Robert Maxwell  was a 17th-century Anglican bishop in Ireland.

The eldest son of Robert Maxwell, Dean of Armagh, he was educated at Trinity College, Dublin. A prebendary of Armagh he was appointed Archdeacon of Down in 1628; and Bishop of Kilmore in 1643. He became Bishop of Kilmore and Ardagh when the two sees were united again in 1661. He died on 16 November 1672.

He married Margaret Echlin, daughter of Robert Echlin, Bishop of Down and Connor and Jane Seton, and had six children. His descendants held the title Earl of Farnham.

References

Archdeacons of Down
Anglican bishops of Kilmore
1672 deaths
Bishops of Kilmore and Ardagh